The first world record in the men's 200 metres breaststroke in long course (50 metres) swimming was recognised by the International Swimming Federation (FINA) in 1908 and the first world record in the women's 200 metres breaststroke was recognised in 1921. In the short course (25 metres) swimming events the world's governing body recognizes world records since March 3, 1991.

There have been two rule changes enacted by FINA for this event that have resulted in the nullification of world records.

In the mid-1930s, many breaststroke swimmers began practicing an early variant of the butterfly stroke that involved recovering the arms above the water in an effort to reduce drag. This technique was disallowed when the butterfly stroke was established as a distinct stroke with its own rules in 1953, and world records set using the technique were nullified.

Another style was developed by the Japanese swimmer Masaru Furukawa shortly after this rule change. It involved swimming underwater for as much of each pool length as possible without surfacing, as the act of breaking the water's surface created resistance, slowing a swimmer. This method of swimming the breaststroke was disallowed by FINA in 1956 and records set with the technique were nullified.

(see History of swimming)

Men

Long course

Note: 200 Meter World Record Prior to 1953
The world record for the 200-meter breaststroke prior to the bifurcation of the butterfly breaststroke into separate strokes in 1953 could be accomplished in either short or long course pools. FINA recognized only one world record for the 200-meter breaststroke. The 1952 US Olympic Book lists the 200-meter breaststroke world record as belonging to Herbert Klein with a time of 2:27.3  who swam it in a short course pool. FINA now recognizes and lists on their website Herbert Klein's long course world record of 2:34.4 for the 200-meter breaststroke set on August 13, 1950, in Göppingen, Germany rather than his world record  of 2:27.3 set in a short course pool.  John Davies tied Herbert Klein's long course world record of 2:34.4 for the 200-meter breaststroke at their 1952 Olympic final.  Bowen Stassforth's time of 2:34.7 in the 220 yard breaststroke (long course) at the 1952 AAU Outdoor Nationals correlates to a time of 2:33 in the 200 meter breaststroke (long course).  This performance was the fastest all-time for the 220 yard breaststroke (long course) and would have been the fastest 200 meter breaststroke (long course) in history (pre-bifurcation of the breaststroke in 1953) as well if it had been dual timed.  This is evidenced by the dual distance timed race in the 1950 National AAU Indoor Championships  in the 220 yard breaststroke (short course) between Joe Verdeur and Robert Brawner. During the race, Verdeur broke the world record for 200 meters with a time of 2:28.3 (short course).  However, Brawner won the race with a time of 2:29.3 for the full 220 yards beating Verdeur who was second in 2:29.4.

Short course

Women

Long course

Short course

All-time top 25

Men long course
Correct as of July 2022

Notes
Below is a list of other times equal or superior to 2:07.62:
Zac Stubblety-Cook also swam 2:06.28 (2021), 2:06.38 (2021), 2:06.72 (2022), 2:07.00 (2021, 2021), 2:07.07 (2022), 2:07.28 (2019), 2:07.35 (2021), 2:07.36 (2019), 2:07.37 (2021).
Matthew Wilson also swam 2:06.68 (2019), 2:07.16 (2019), 2:07.29 (2019).
Ippei Watanabe also swam 2:06.73 (2019), 2:07.02 (2019), 2:07.08 (2020), 2:07.22 (2016), 2:07.44 (2017), 2:07.47 (2017), 2:07.54 (2021), 2:07.56 (2018), 2:07.60 (2017).
Shoma Sato also swam 2:06.74 (2021), 2:06.78 (2021), 2:07.02 (2020), 2:07.58 (2020).
Anton Chupkov also swam 2:06.80 (2018), 2:06.83 (2019), 2:06.96 (2017), 2:06.99 (2021), 2:07.00 (2019), 2:07.14 (2017), 2:07.19 (2022), 2:07.24 (2021), 2:07.32 (2020), 2:07.46 (2017), 2:07.48 (2019), 2:07.59 (2018).
Arno Kamminga also swam 2:07.01 (2021), 2:07.17 (2020) 2:07.18 (2020), 2:07.23 (2021), 2:07.35 (2021),  2:07.37 (2021), 2:07.39 (2021), 2:07.48 (2021), 2:07.54 (2020).
Josh Prenot also swam 2:07.28 (2018), 2:07.53 (2016).
Dániel Gyurta also swam 2:07.28 (2012).
Yasuhiro Koseki also swam 2:07.29 (2017).
Akihiro Yamaguchi also swam 2:07.57 (2012).
Marco Koch also swam 2:07.60 (2019).

Men short course
Correct as of December 2022

Notes
Below is a list of other times equal or superior to 2:02.64:
Dániel Gyurta also swam 2:00.67 (2009).
Daiya Seto also swam 2:01.30 (2017), 2:01.49 (2021), 2:01.65 (2021), 2:02.43 (2022), 2:02.48 (2021).
Qin Haiyang also swam 2:01.64 (2018), 2:02.22 (2022).
Anton Chupkov also swam 2:01.65 (2017).
Anton McKee also swam 2:01.73 (2020).
Arno Kamminga also swam 2:01.74 (2021), 2:01.92 (2021), 2:02.13 (2021), 2:02.42 (2021), 2:02.54 (2021).
Mikhail Dorinov also swam 2:02.07 (2021).
Ilya Shymanovich also swam 2:02.10 (2021).
Nic Fink also swam 2:02.20 (2020), 2:02.28 (2021).
Erik Persson also swam 2:02.39 (2021).
Ippei Watanabe also swam 2:02.53 (2022).

Women long course
Correct as of July 2022

Notes
Below is a list of other times equal or superior to 2:22.00:
Tatjana Schoenmaker also swam 2:19.16 (2021), 2:19.33 (2021), 2:20.17 (2021), 2:21.30 (2021), 2:21.76 (2022), 2:21.79 (2019), 2:21.92 (2022).
Rikke Møller Pedersen also swam 2:19.61 (2014), 2:19.67 (2014), 2:19.84 (2014), 2:19.94 (2014), 2:20.08 (2013), 2:20.53 (2013), 2:21.55 (2013), 2:21.58 (2015), 2:21.60 (2015), 2:21.65 (2012), 2:21.69 (2016), 2:21.99 (2015).
Yuliya Yefimova also swam 2:19.64 (2017), 2:19.83 (2017), 2:19.85 (2013), 2:20.15 (2017), 2:20.17 (2019), 2:20.72 (2018), 2:20.92 (2012), 2:21.20 (2019), 2:21.31 (2018), 2:21.35 (2017), 2:21.41 (2016), 2:21.49 (2017), 2:21.54 (2017), 2:21.59 (2019), 2:21.60 (2019), 2:21.86 (2021), 2:21.97 (2016).
Rebecca Soni also swam 2:20.00 (2012), 2:20.22 (2008), 2:20.38 (2009), 2:20.69 (2010), 2:20.93 (2009), 2:21.03 (2011), 2:21.13 (2012), 2:21.40 (2012), 2:21.41 (2010), 2:21.45 (2012), 2:21.46 (2011), 2:21.47 (2011), 2:21.60 (2010).
Rie Kaneto also swam 2:20.04 (2016), 2:20.30 (2016), 2:20.72 (2009), 2:20.93 (2016), 2:21.05 (2016), 2:21.58 (2014), 2:21.90 (2014, 2015), 2:21.92 (2014).
Evgeniia Chikunova also swam 2:20.57 (2021), 2:20.88 (2021), 2:21.07 (2019), 2:21.63 (2021), 2:21.87 (2020).
Leisel Jones also swam 2:20.58 (2008), 2:20.72 (2006), 2:21.34 (2008), 2:21.45 (2007), 2:21.60 (2006), 2:21.72 (2005), 2:21.81 (2008), 2:21.84 (2007).
Annamay Pierse also swam 2:20.71 (2009), 2:21.68 (2009), 2:21.84 (2009).
Annie Lazor also swam 2:20.84 (2021), 2:21.07 (2021), 2:21.40 (2019), 2:21.67 (2020), 2:21.91 (2022), 2:21.94 (2021).
Kanako Watanabe also swam 2:21.09 (2014), 2:21.15 (2015), 2:21.41 (2014), 2:21.82 (2014).
Lilly King also swam 2:21.19 (2022), 2:21.39 (2019), 2:21.75 (2021), 2:21.82 (2021), 2:21.83 (2017).
Molly Renshaw also swam 2:21.34 (2021), 2:21.55 (2021).
Taylor McKeown also swam 2:21.69 (2016).
Bethany Galat also swam 2:21.84 (2019), 2:21.86 (2017).
Abbie Wood also swam 2:21.86 (2021).
Micah Sumrall also swam 2:21.88 (2018).

Women short course
Correct as of December 2022

Notes

Below is a list of other times equal or superior to 2:18.09:
Yuliya Efimova also swam 2:15.62 (2018), 2:16.05 (2018), 2:16.29 (2018).
Lilly King also swam 2:15.80 (2020), 2:16.04 (2020), 2:17.13 (2022), 2:17.56 (2022), 2:17.66 (2021).
Rie Kaneto also swam 2:15.91 (2016), 2:16.27 (2016), 2:16.30 (2016), 2:18.09 (2014).
Rikke Møller Pedersen also swam 2:15.93 (2013), 2:16.08 (2012).
Kate Douglass also swam 2:16.52 (2022).
Evgenia Chikunova also swam 2:16.88 (2021), 2:17.57 (2021), 2:17.88 (2021), 2:18.08 (2021).
Annamay Pierse also swam 2:17.50 (2009).
Leisel Jones also swam 2:17.75 (2003).
Emily Escobedo also swam 2:17.85 (2021).
Molly Renshaw also swam 2:17.96 (2021).
Kelsey Wog also swam 2:18.06 (2019).

References

  Zwemkroniek
  Agenda Diana

Breaststroke 200 metres
World record progression 200 metres breaststroke